Saxon is an English toponymic surname. The name is derived from the Old English Seaxe tun, meaning "Saxon village". People with the surname include:
 Alex Saxon (actor) (born 1987), American actor
 Arthur Saxon (1878–1921), German strongman and circus performer
 Avon Saxon (c. 1857–1909), Canadian opera singer
 Charles Saxon (1920–1988), American cartoonist for The New Yorker
 David S. Saxon (1920–2005), American physicist, educator and President of University of California system
 Edgar J. Saxon (1877–1956), British naturopath and writer
 Edward Saxon (born 1956), American film producer
 Henry Saxon (1918–2005), English artist specialising in miniatures
 Isaiah Saxon (born 1983), American film and music video director
 James Saxon (painter) (1772–1819 or later), British portrait painter
 James Saxon (actor) (1955–2003), British actor
 James Saxon (American football) (born 1966), American National Football League coach and former running back
 James J. Saxon (1914–1980), 21st Comptroller of the Currency for the United States Department of the Treasury
 John Saxon (1936–2020), American film and television actor
 John Saxon (educator) (1923–1996), known for developing a new system of mathematics education
 Ken Saxon (1894–1976), New Zealand soldier, cricketer and teacher
 Kurt Saxon (born 1932), survivalist and author of The Poor Man's James Bond
 Leslie Saxon, Canadian professor of linguistics
 Lyle Saxon (1891–1946), American writer and journalist
 Mack Saxon (c. 1901 – 1949), American football player, coach of football, basketball and baseball, and college athletic administrator
 Marie Saxon (1904–1941), American actress in vaudeville and theatre
 Mike Saxon (born 1962), American retired National Football League punter
 Richard Saxon (born 1942), British architect
 Rolf Saxon (born 1955), American actor

English-language surnames
Surnames of English origin
English toponymic surnames